Xiangtan railway station is a railway station of the Hukun Railway and the Changsha–Zhuzhou–Xiangtan intercity railway located in Yuhu District, Xiangtan in Hunan province, People's Republic of China. It is under the administration of China Railway Guangzhou Group. It is currently a second-class station.

Xiangtan railway station was built in 1958, and the reconstruction and expansion project was carried out in 2008. The project was completed on December 26, 2012, and put into operation.

As of December 2012, the total construction area of the station building is 20,000 square meters.

References 

Railway stations in Hunan
1958 establishments in China
Railway stations in China opened in 1958